Stolze Peak is a peak on Arctowski Peninsula near the head of Beaupre Cove, on the west coast of Graham Land. Mapped by the Falkland Islands Dependencies Survey (FIDS) from photos taken by Hunting Aerosurveys Ltd. in 1956–57. Named by the United Kingdom Antarctic Place-Names Committee (UK-APC) in 1960 for Franz Stolze, German scientist who in 1881 suggested improvements in methods of air photography and, in 1892, first established the principle of the "floating mark" used in stereophotogrammetry, later developed by Pulfrich.

Notes 

Mountains of Graham Land
Danco Coast